The Sacred Heart Cathedral or simply Cathedral of Monrovia, is a religious building belonging to the Catholic Church and is located across Broad Street in the heart of the city of Monrovia, capital of the African country of Liberia.

It is a temple that serves as the headquarters of the Metropolitan Archdiocese of Monrovia (Archidioecesis Monroviensis) that was created on December 19, 1981 by Pope John Paul II by the bull Patet Ecclesiae. Follow the Roman or Latin rite and is under the pastoral responsibility of the Bishop Lewis Zeigler.

See also
 Roman Catholic Archdiocese of Monrovia
Roman Catholicism in Liberia
Sacred Heart Cathedral (disambiguation)

References

Roman Catholic cathedrals in Liberia
Buildings and structures in Monrovia